The 1981 Kentucky Derby was the 107th running of the Kentucky Derby. The race took place on May 2, 1981, with 139,195 people in attendance.

Full results

 Winning Breeder: Thomas Mellon Evans; (VA)

References

1981
Kentucky Derby
Derby
Kentucky
Kentucky Derby